This table lists opinion polls and results of elections between the Irish general elections of 2007 and 2011.

Graphical summary

The chart shows the relative state of the parties from September 2007 to the February 2011 election.

Polls

References

External links
Opinion Polls 2007–2011 (ElectionsIreland.org)

2011 Irish general election
Opinion polling in the Republic of Ireland